"My Life" is a song by Australian pop/new wave group Kids in the Kitchen. The song was released in November 1985 as the sixth and final single from their debut album, Shine (1985). The song peaked at number 74 on the Australian Kent Music Report.

The group performed the song live on Countdown.

Track listing 
7" (K9885) 
Side A "My Life" (single edit) 
Side B1 "Fun - Take One" 
Side B2 "Frog"

Charts

Weekly charts

References 

1985 songs
1985 singles
Kids in the Kitchen songs
Mushroom Records singles